Michael Schiffer is an American screenwriter, video game writer and film producer.

Schiffer is known for such films and video games as Colors, Lean on Me, Crimson Tide, The Four Feathers, The Peacemaker and Call of Duty.

Filmography

Film

Other credits

Video games
Call of Duty (2003)
Call of Duty: Finest Hour (2004)
Call of Duty 2 (2005)

References

External links

Year of birth missing (living people)
Living people
American screenwriters
American film producers
Video game writers